Big Sag is an unincorporated community in Chouteau County, in the U.S. state of Montana. It is located off of Montana Secondary Highway 228. It is near the Big Sag Waterfowl Production Area.

History
The community took its name from the nearby Big Sag valley. Big Sag has been noted for its unusual place name.

References

Unincorporated communities in Chouteau County, Montana
Unincorporated communities in Montana